Night of the Dead is a 2006 American horror film written and directed by Eric Forsberg.  It stars Louis Graham as Dr. Gabriel Schreklich, a scientist who seeks to resurrect his dead family.

Plot 
Dr. Gabriel Schreklich loses his wife and daughter.  Distraught, he founds The Institute for Life Extension, where tries to find a way to resurrect the dead.  Schreklich's nephew Peter helps him, not knowing that his pregnant wife Anais is in danger.  Schreklich's experiments are a success, and his family is brought back to a semblance of life, but they are now ghouls, in pain and hungry for the flesh of the living.  When they escape their confinement, the whole institute is put at risk.

Cast 
 Louis Graham as Dr. Gabriel Schreklich
 Joey Jalalian as Anais Sturben
 Gabriel Womack as Peter Sturben
 Deirdre V. Lyons as Schatzi
 Lola Forsberg as Christi
 Dave Reynolds as Gunther
 Mary Christina Brown as Lith

Production 
Night of the Dead was produced by director Eric Forsberg's own production company, Cerebral Experiment.  Forsberg sold his house to finance the film.  It was shot on a single location.

Release 
The original title for Night of the Dead was Night of the Leben Tod, which later turned into Night of the Dead: Leben Tod. The Asylum simplified the film's title to Night of the Dead when they purchased the movie in 2006.

Reception 
In The Zombie Movie Encyclopedia, Volume 2, Peter Dendle wrote that the film is a low budget ripoff of Re-Animator with minimal changes, such as changing the color of the reagent and giving the antagonist an occasional German accent.  Steve Anderson of Film Threat rated the film 1/5 stars and called it a low budget knockoff of Re-Animator.  Milos Jovanovic of HorrorTalk rated 3/5 stars and wrote, "Night of the Dead: Leben Tod is not quite Bad Taste or Braindead, but it's a step in that direction, and a good one."

References

External links 
 

2006 films
2006 horror films
2006 independent films
American zombie films
American independent films
Films directed by Eric Forsberg
Films with screenplays by Eric Forsberg
2000s English-language films
2000s American films